Casperia erebipennis is the only species in the  monotypic moth genus Casperia of the family Erebidae. It is known from Colombia. Both the genus and the species were first described by Francis Walker in 1867.

References

Hypeninae